Inspired Guns is a 2014 comedy film. It was written, directed, and produced by Adam White, who also plays a role in the film. It is distributed by Pitch White Entertainment. Most of the cast and crew are members of the Church of Jesus Christ of Latter-day Saints and one of the stated goals of the movie is to "create good clean content" for family audiences.

The film is about two Mormon missionaries who begin teaching members of the mafia who think the young men are messengers from "The Boss" with a hidden message regarding an upcoming hit.

Story

The last thing Elder Fisher expects when he and his brand-new companion, Elder Johnson, hit the city streets is a couple of seemingly golden prospects. But dimwitted brothers Roger and Larry, low-level Mafioso, think the two Mormon missionaries who approach them have been sent by the "Boss" to deliver their next assignment. So the brothers are willing to listen to anything the young men in dark suits have to say—including a message of salvation—even if Elder Johnson is the most overconfident and underprepared missionary to ever attempt to preach the word of God. Soon the witless brothers are searching through the Book of Mormon in a quest to find a hidden message. But as the missionaries and Roger and Larry continue to meet for discussions, both the mafia and the FBI have their sights set on Elders Fisher and Johnson. Now the mismatched elders must learn to rely on each other to survive their likely lethal case of mistaken identity.

Main cast

 Shona Kay- Helen
 Dashiell Wolf- Elder Johnson
 David Lassetter as Elder Fisher
 Jarrod Phillips- Johnny "The Butcher" Rossi
 Rick Macy- Boss
 Charan Prabhakar- Smooth Talker
 Alix Maria Taulbee- Sister Reed
 Andrew W. Johnson- Dave
 Jake Suazo- Larry
 Christian Busath- Roger
 Johnny Ahn- Elder Okinawa
 Brett Merritt- Agent Knight
 Scott Beringer- Agent McNeil

Box office
The film was made on a budget of $175,000.  It debuted in limited theaters on January 24, 2014.

See also
 LDS cinema

References

External links

 

2014 films
Films shot in Utah
Mormon cinema
Mafia comedy films
2010s English-language films
2010s American films